Árpád Örs György Tordai (born 11 March 1997) is a Romanian professional footballer who plays as a goalkeeper for Nemzeti Bajnokság I club Mezőkövesd.

Personal life 
He is of Hungarian ethnicity.

Honours

Club
Viitorul Constanța
Liga I: 2016–17
Cupa României: 2018–19
Supercupa României: 2019

Fehérvár
Magyar Kupa runner-up: 2020–21

References

External links
 
 

1997 births
Living people
People from Târgu Mureș
Sportspeople from Târgu Mureș
Romanian people of Hungarian descent
Romanian footballers
Romanian sportspeople of Hungarian descent
Romania youth international footballers
Romania under-21 international footballers
Association football goalkeepers
Liga I players
FC Viitorul Constanța players
Liga II players
FC Petrolul Ploiești players
FC Universitatea Cluj players
Nemzeti Bajnokság I players
Fehérvár FC players
FCV Farul Constanța players
Mezőkövesdi SE footballers
Romanian expatriate footballers
Romanian expatriate sportspeople in Hungary
Expatriate footballers in Hungary